Staufenberg is the southernmost municipality of the district of Göttingen, and of Lower Saxony, Germany. It is situated east of the river Fulda, approx. 6 km south of Hannoversch Münden, and 12 km northeast of Kassel. Its seat is in the village Landwehrhagen.

Points of interest
 Arboretum Habichtsborn

References

Göttingen (district)